Aengus Ó hEodhasa, Irish poet, died 1480.

Ó hEodhasa was a member of a brehon family based in County Fermanagh. The Annals of the Four Masters record his death in 1480, stating Ua h-Eodhosa, .i. Aongus mac Seain saoí fhir dhána ... d'écc./O'Hosey, i.e. Aengus, the son of John, a learned poet ... died.

See also

 Ciothruaidh Ó hEodhasa, poet, died 1518.
 Giolla Brighde Ó hEoghusa, poet, 1608–1614.
 Gemma Hussey, Fine Gael TD and Minister, 1977–1989.

External links
 http://www.ucc.ie/celt/published/T100005D/
 http://www.irishtimes.com/ancestor/surname/index.cfm?fuseaction=Go.&UserID=

People from County Fermanagh
15th-century Irish poets
Irish male poets